Grimes is an unincorporated community in northern Frederick County, Virginia, United States. Grimes lies to the west of Cedar Hill on Welltown Road (VA 661).

References

Unincorporated communities in Frederick County, Virginia
Unincorporated communities in Virginia